Macrocheilus saulcyi is a species of ground beetle in the subfamily Anthiinae. It was described by Louis Alexandre Auguste Chevrolat in 1854.

References

Anthiinae (beetle)
Beetles described in 1854